The Kuna language (formerly Cuna, and in the language itself Guna), spoken by the Kuna people of Panama and Colombia, belongs to the Chibchan language family.

History
The Kuna were living in what is now Northern Colombia and the Darién Province of Panama at the time of the Spanish invasion, and only later began to move westward towards what is now Guna Yala due to a conflict with Spanish and other indigenous groups.  Centuries before the conquest, the Kuna arrived in South America as part of a Chibchan migration moving east from Central America.  At the time of the Spanish invasion, they were living in the region of Uraba and near the borders of what are now Antioquia and Caldas. Alonso de Ojeda and Vasco Núñez de Balboa explored the coast of Colombia in 1500 and 1501.  They spent the most time in the Gulf of Urabá, where they made contact with the Kuna.

In far-eastern Guna Yala, the community of New Caledonia is near the site where Scottish explorers tried, unsuccessfully, to establish a colony in the "New World". The bankruptcy of the expedition has been cited as one of the motivations of the 1707 Acts of Union.

There is a wide consensus regarding the migrations of Kuna from Colombia and the Darien towards what is now Guna Yala.  These migrations were caused partly by wars with the Catio people, but some sources contend that they were mostly due to bad treatment by the Spanish invaders. The Kuna themselves attribute their migration to Guna Yala to conflicts with the native peoples, and their migration to the islands to the excessive mosquito populations on the mainland.

During the first decades of the twentieth century, the Panamanian government attempted to suppress many of the traditional customs. This was bitterly resisted, culminating in a short-lived yet successful revolt in 1925 known as the Tule Revolution (or people revolution), led by Iguaibilikinya Nele Gantule of Ustupu  and supported by American adventurer and part-time diplomat Richard Marsh – and a treaty in which the Panamanians agreed to give the Kuna some degree of cultural autonomy.

Phonemes
Kuna language recognizes 5 vowel phonemes and 17 consonantal phonemes.

Vowels

Vowels may be short or long.

Consonants

Most consonants may appear either as short (lax) or long (tense).  The long consonants only appear in intervocalic position. However, they are not always a result of morpheme concatenation, and they often differ phonetically from the short analogue.  For example, the long stop consonants p, t, and k are pronounced as voiceless, usually with longer duration than in English.  The short counterparts are pronounced as voiced b, d, and g when they are between vowels or beside sonorant consonants m, n, l, r, y, or w (they are written using b, d, and g in the Kuna alphabet).  At the beginnings of words, the stops may be pronounced either as voiced or voiceless; and are usually pronounced as voiceless word-finally  (Long consonants do not appear word-initially or word-finally).  In an even more extreme case, the long s is pronounced [tʃ].  Underlying long consonants become short before another consonant. The letter w may be pronounced as either [v] or [w] depending on dialect and position.

In 2010, the National Kuna Congress decided a spelling reform by which long consonants should be written with double letters. Equally, the old digraph  becomes  or  depending on its morphological precedence (narassole [naraʧole] < naras + sole, godsa [koʧa] 'called' < godde 'to call' + -sa (past). So, the reformed orthography uses only the fifteen letters  for transcribing all the sounds of the language, with the digraphs  for the tense consonants.

Other phonological rules

The alveolar /s/ becomes the postalveolar [ʃ] after /n/ or /t/.
Both long and short /k/ become [j] before another consonant.

Morphology
Kuna is an agglutinative language which contains words of up to about 9 morphemes, although words of two or three morphemes are more common. Most of the morphological complexity is found in the verb, which contains suffixes of tense and aspect, plurals, negatives, position (sitting, standing, etc.) and various adverbials. The verb is not marked for person.

References

Further reading 
Llerena Villalobos, Rito. (1987). Relación y determinación en el predicado de la lengua Kuna. Bogotá: CCELA – Universidad de los Andes. ISSN 0120-9507 

de Gerdes, Marta Lucía. (2003). "'The life story of grandmother Elida': Kuna personal narratives as verbal art." In Translating native Latin American verbal art: Ethnopoetics and ethnography of speaking. Kay Sammons and Joel Sherzer, eds. Washington, D.C
Wikaliler Daniel Smith. 2014. A Grammar of Guna: A Community-Centered Approach. University of Texas at Austin.

External links
Kuna phrasebook
Vocabulario Castellano-Cuna: Compuesto por el Señor Don Alfonso L. Pinart
Kuna language, Archive of the Indigenous Languages of Latin America
OLAC resources in and about the San Blas Kuna language
ELAR archive of Documentation and Description of Kuna
Kuna Collection of Marta Lucía de Gerdes, including recordings and translations of a narrative and a chant, from the Archive of the Indigenous Languages of Latin America.
Gammibe Gun Galu, an archive of recordings of a Kuna musical group, from the Archive of the Indigenous Languages of Latin America.

Chibchan languages
Languages of Panama
Languages of Colombia
Circum-Caribbean culture